Ahmed Chami sometimes Ahmed Reda Chami ( – born 16 May 1961, Casablanca) is a Moroccan politician of the Socialist Union of Popular Forces. Between 2007 and 2012, he held the position of Minister of Industry, Trade and New Technologies in the cabinet of Abbas El Fassi.

In December 2019, he was appointed by the king of Morocco in the Special Committee on Model of Development.

See also
Cabinet of Morocco

References

External links
Official Twitter account

Living people
Government ministers of Morocco
1961 births
People from Casablanca
Moroccan businesspeople
Moroccan engineers
Socialist Union of Popular Forces politicians